The Conquista rose, registered under the name RUICH1069A, is a modern soft pink hybrid tea rose cultivar developed in Holland by De Ruiter Innovations B.V. and introduced in 2014.  Conquista is a Spanish term meaning "conquest".

Description 
The plant is tall-growing, upright and compact. The cupped flowers have a bright, unfading colour with a suffused rose reverse. The large blooms develop from urn-shaped buds and grow singly on firm stems, which vary in length from 40 to 70 cm. They open slowly, reach an average diameter of 9 cm, have 40 to 45 petals (tight bloom), and are not scented. The variety is almost thornless and has glossy foliage with serrated leaves of a dark green colour.

Cultivation 
The rose is bred for cultivation in greenhouses or grown in pots, but can tolerate outside temperatures. It is generally disease-resistant and ideal for warm situations. The long-stemmed flowers are showy and long-lasting and are well suited as cut flowers.

Namesake 
The Conquista rose was named after the 2005 opera La Conquista by Italian composer Lorenzo Ferrero.

See also 

 Floriculture
 Garden roses

Notes and references

External links 
 Royal Horticultural Society website

2014 introductions
Conquista